IDH may refer to:

 Isocitrate dehydrogenase
 Intermediate Disturbance Hypothesis
 Interactive Data Handler
 Intradialytic hypotension